Indiana has become one of the premiere states for high school rugby, with the boys' top league, the Super League, crowned the 2014 toughest high school league. Indiana teams have claimed multiple national and regional championships. At the start of the 2016 season, there were approximately fifty boys teams and fifteen girls teams competing in Indiana. The fifty boys teams were organized into four programs in the Super League, eight in Division 1, twelve in Division 2, and one developmental side. In addition to varsity competition, many programs also contest in junior varsity and developmental competitions, allowing programs to put forth multiple teams.

Governance
Unlike most high school sports in Indiana, governed by the Indiana High School Athletic Association, rugby in Indiana is governed by the Indiana Youth Rugby Foundation, Inc., which was formed in 1999 to replace the Indiana Youth Rugby Association, Inc. (1990–1999). The foundation operates under the brand Rugby Indiana and is a 501(c)(3) charitable non-profit corporation that operates outside the governing structure of the Indiana Rugby Football Union. Rugby Indiana's stated vision is:
 To make rugby a legitimate high school sport opportunity for all athletes by providing a great experience on and off the field, and by gaining recognition in High School, Middle School, and Grade School administrations
 Stimulate the quality, growth and development of Rugby at the High School and Youth level
 To raise awareness of, and educate the general public about the sport of Rugby

Top performing teams may also compete in a regional competition governed by the Midwest Rugby Football Union and a national invitational competition. These competitions, unlike Indiana state-level competition, make a distinction between whether teams are composed of players drawn from a single school or a club program open to multiple student bodies.

Play and participation
As Allyn Freeman explained in an article for RugbyToday.com, "America's high schools represented the last place of expansion" for domestic rugby. Although slow to catch on, rugby at the high school level has exploded in growth since the close of the twentieth century. From 2008 to 2013, rugby participation grew by 81% in the United States, while participation in American football fell 21.1% in the same span. In 2014, participation reached 1.2 million, making rugby the fastest growing sport in the United States. As of 2011, Indiana Rugby boasted 1,227 players at the high school level (902 boys, 325 girls).

Unlike senior level clubs, which play two forty-minute halves, youth rugby in the United States is capped below the traditional eighty-minute match. In Indiana, matches are scheduled for two thirty-minute halves, with players not allowed to participate in more than ninety minutes of scheduled match time in a single day. In competitions in which teams compete in multiple matches, the total length of the match is truncated to comport with the ninety-minute daily cap, thus, the matches are contested at two halves each of 22.5 minutes in duration. Matches consist of fifteen players on the field for each team along with eight reserves on the bench (23 total). Matches will end in a draw if level at the end of full-time unless in a championship competition. In a championship competition, if the match is level at full-time, an additional ten-minute sudden death period is played. If the match remains level after sudden death, then the outcome is decided on drop kicks. If multiple matches are to be contested in a single day, the sudden death period is foregone. Coed play at the high school level is not permitted. The coed prohibition was tested in May 2001 by the Mishawaka High School boys squads' attempt to include Nicole Kodba in its playoff lineup. Despite arguments from her coach and a community petition, Kodba was not allowed to compete for the boys team. The ruling was controversial and drew critics from among the rugby coaching ranks.

Rugby Indiana's season is broken into three different phases: a competitive season from March through June, a select side season (akin to all-star teams) from June through July, and a fall sevens season from September through October. Based upon team participation, competition is held across a divisional and conference structure. At the top of the boys' competition is the Super League, comprising four teams. The next tier is Division 1 which divides eight teams among a north and south conference. In addition to the typical varsity competition, both Division 1 and the Super League hold a junior varsity competition that competes for a state championship. Below Division 1 is Division 2, which presently includes twelve teams split into north and south conferences. At times, Rugby Indiana has also conducted a developmental league to aid new programs. When participation is sufficient, the girls competition is broken into two divisions. In 2016, only a single division was used for girls rugby spread across north and south conferences of unequal numbers.

In order for players to compete, they must be registered both with Rugby Indiana and USA Rugby. Players must also not have reached nineteen years of age prior to September 1. Girls in the 8th grade who are at least 14 years of age may, at the head coach's discretion, compete on a high school team. Players must be enrolled in high school, enrolled in a GED program, or meet the standards of Indiana home school requirements. Players are also required to attend at least four practices with coached supervised tackling prior to participation in a sanctioned match. Players are also required to hold amateur status.

Boys Championships

Super League

In 2014, four perennial powerhouse teams formed a new top tier, supplanting Division 1 as the highest tier. The original four teams forming the Super League were Brownsburg, the Royal Irish Rugby Club based out Cathedral and Bishop Chatard, Notre Dame de La Salette of Georgetown, Illinois, and Penn. Each team has reached tremendous heights on the national stage: the Royal Irish have claimed four national titles (2012, 2014, 2015, 2017), Brownsburg claimed the 2005 Tier II national championship, and both Penn and La Salette have reached the national finals. After the 2014 season, this prolonged success led Goff Rugby Report to declare the Indiana Super League the toughest high school league in the United States. In 2017, Notre Dame de La Salette began to compete in Illinois, leaving the four-team super league structure missing a fourth team. The Super League was expanded to nine teams split into two divisions. In the North Division were Bishop Dwenger, Carroll, Culver, and Penn. In the South Division were Brownsburg, Fishers, Hamilton Southeast, Royal Irish, and St. Xavier. At seasons end, Royal Irish, fresh off a national championship, would edge Penn for the Super League title. The restructured competition also introduced the Challenge Cup as a consolation competition at the state playoffs. In 2019, the Super League contracted to seven teams with St. Xavier and Hamilton Southeastern dropping to Division 1.

Varsity State Champion

Varsity Challenge Cup Champion

Junior Varsity State Champion

Junior Varsity Challenge Cup Champion

Division 1

In the spring of 1990, the Indiana Youth Rugby Association was formed with teams drawn from the Indianapolis area and spearheaded by "members and alumni of the Indianapolis Rugby Football Club[.]" Falling below the target of eight teams and 200 players, the inaugural season drew more than 100 players and produced five teams drawn from students of Scencina-Howe-Warren Central, Chatard, North Central, Lawrence Central and the Boys’ School. The teams competed in a seven-game schedule culminating in a playoff to crown a state champion. With Lawrence Central's victory in what would become the Division 1 state championship, the school was awarded both the inaugural state title and an Indianapolis city championship. By 2003, participation had expanded to 24 boys teams and 12 girls teams statewide.

Varsity State Champion

* – Penn did not compete in state tournament due to conflict with national championship tournament schedule.

Varsity Challenge Cup

Junior Varsity
Historically, top-level rugby teams in Indiana would commit a B-side to playing in Division 2. In 2012, a formal Junior Varsity championship was implemented. It was abandoned following the 2016 season.

Division 2

Girls Championships

Super League

Division 1

Varsity Challenge Cup

Division 2

Fall 7s Championships
Following the induction of the shortcode of Rugby Union, known as Rugby sevens, into the 2016 Summer Olympics, Rugby Indiana added a high school fall 7s competition to augment its XVs spring competitions. The inaugural season was 2016 and consists of a 4-week season, with games on Sundays. For the first three weeks, each team/side got a minimum of two matches on each Sunday. The first three weeks scores/results did not count toward the ranking for championship. The 4th week was a championship tournament.

Source: Rugby IndianaSource: Rugby Indiana

Boys

Girls

Indiana Teams at Midwest Tournament

Boys

(c) – represents club team designation(s) – represents single-school team designation

In 2018, the Midwest tournament ceased the split between single-school and club teams.

Girls

(c) – represents club team designation(s) – represents single-school team designation

Indiana Teams at National Championships

Boys

In 2007, the national championship tournament split schools based upon whether their programs were made of students from a single school or a club of combined schools.

(c) – represents club team designation(ii) – represents Tier II contestant(s) – represents single-school team designation
Source: Goff Rugby ReportSource: Boys High School Rugby National Championships

Girls

(c) – represents club team designation(s) – represents single-school team designation

Source: Goff Rugby Report

Mr. & Miss Rugby
Beginning in 2016, The Indianapolis Star added rugby to its list of Spring Award recipients. In 2019, the Star did not include rugby in its Spring Awards. Prior to that time, Mr. and Miss Rugby Indiana appears to have been selected by the Indiana Rugby Football Union, coinciding with all-state selections. The data below were sourced from Indiana newspapers searched through Newspapers.com from 1990 through 2019 and represent all information that could be gleaned therefrom.

Mr. Rugby

Miss Rugby

See also
 Midwest Rugby Football Union
 USA Rugby

References

External links
Official Site

Rugby union competitions in the United States
Rugby union in Indiana